Spacetime Donuts is a novel by Rudy Rucker published in 1981.

Plot summary
Spacetime Donuts is a novel in which the universe is a single particle which is folded to create everything we see.

Reception
Greg Costikyan reviewed Spacetime Donuts in Ares Magazine #12 and commented that "Not up to the caliber of Rucker's previous White Light."

Reviews
Review by Barry N. Malzberg (1982) in The Magazine of Fantasy & Science Fiction, June 1982 
Review by Tom Easton (1982) in Analog Science Fiction/Science Fact, June 1982 
Review by Thomas M. Disch (1982) in Rod Serling's The Twilight Zone Magazine, June 1982

See also
One-electron universe

References

1981 novels